Maurice McLoughlin defeated Wallace F. Johnson 3–6, 2–6, 6–2, 6–4, 6–2 in the final to win the men's singles tennis title at the 1912 U.S. National Championships. The event was held at the Newport Casino in Newport, R.I. in the United States. The challenge round was abolished in this edition, thus requiring all participants, including the defending champion, to play the main draw.

Draw

Finals

References

Men's Singles
1912